Rumyana Spasova (born 5 February 1989 in Sofia) is a Bulgarian former pair skater. She competed with Stanimir Todorov. The two are the three time Bulgarian national champions. They placed 19th at the 2006 Winter Olympics, becoming the first Bulgarian pair skaters to compete at the Olympics.

Programs 
(with Todorov)

Results 
(with Todorov)

References

External links 
 
 Pairs on Ice: Rumiana Spassova / Stanimir Todorov

1989 births
Living people
Bulgarian pair skaters
Olympic figure skaters of Bulgaria
Figure skaters at the 2006 Winter Olympics